Grindelia lanceolata is a species of flowering plant in the family Asteraceae known by the common name narrowleaf gumweed.

Distribution
Grindelia lanceolata is native to the south-central United States, primarily in the Ozarks, the Interior Low Plateaus, the southern Great Plains (Texas, Oklahoma, New Mexico, Colorado), and Northeastern Mexico. There are also isolated populations (some of them apparently naturalized) in New Mexico, Colorado, Wisconsin, Ohio, Virginia, South Carolina, and Connecticut.

The species' preferred habitat is limestone glades and rocky prairies.

Description
Grindelia lanceolata is a short-lived monocarpic perennial up to 150 cm (5 feet) tall. Leaves are up to 11 cm (4.4 inches) long, generally with no hairs or only a few hairs. The plant produces yellow flower heads in the summer, usually in flat-topped arrays but sometimes only one per flower stalk. Each head contains 12-36 ray flowers surrounding numerous disc flowers.

References

lanceolata
Flora of Northeastern Mexico
Flora of the North-Central United States
Flora of the South-Central United States
Flora of the Appalachian Mountains
Plants described in 1834
Flora without expected TNC conservation status